Alexandra Elizabeth Shiva is an American film director. Bombay Eunuch is her 2001 award-winning film, and in 2015 she showed How to Dance in Ohio at the Sundance Film Festival in the US Documentary Competition. Shiva also founded a production studio called Gidalya Pictures.

Personal life
Shiva was born in New York City, the daughter of Susan (née Stein) and Gil Shiva. Her grandfather was Jules Stein, founder of MCA, the film, television, and record company. She graduated Vassar College in 1995 with her BA in Art History. In 2003, Shiva married writer Jonathan Marc Sherman, son of Dr. Ronald Sherman and Barbara Daniels Sherman.Together they have two children, a son Sam and a daughter Thea.

Career 
Shiva's first directed documentary film was Bombay Eunuch (2001), which was also co-directed with Sean MacDonald and Michelle Gucovsky. The film was released by Shiva's production company Gidalya Pictures. It examined the decline in the traditional status of eunuchs in India focusing on one family. Meena the leader of the family Shiva follows around allowed the filmmakers into the private world of hijras in hopes of improving the stigma around hijras. Shiva accomplished gaining access to the private world of hijras, which has traditionally been inaccessible to journalists. Thus allowing for a glimpse of a secretive, invisible world. The New Yorker commended the film for dignifying these outcasts and never condescending them.

In 2006, Shiva directed her second documentary film Stagedoor. The film is about the Stagedoor Manor, a premier summer theatre camp for children ages 8 – 18. The film follows extroverted, budding young actors at Stagedoor Manor, where her husband also attended as a boy.

Shiva continued to be interested in the theme of people who felt like they didn't belong but find communities where they do, with her third film How to Dance in Ohio (2015).  The film takes place in Columbus, Ohio following the story of three teenage girls who have autism preparing to go to the prom. It shows the courage of people facing their fears and entering the adult world. This was Shiva's first film she created after her children were born. She intended to make it in NYC, but her research led her to Ohio where she discovered Emilio Amigo, a psychologist working with autistic children.

The US TV rights for How to Dance in Ohio were acquired by HBO Documentary Films. The film premiered at the 2015 Sundance Film Festival and will appeared on HBO later in 2015. It won a Peabody Award in 2016. The film is being adapted into a musical by composers Jacob Yandura and Rebekah Greer Melocik, which was conceived of by Hal Prince.

In 2018, Shiva directed This is Home: A Refugee Story, an intimate portrait of four Syrian refugee families arriving in America and struggling to find their footing. The film premiered at the 2018 Sundance Film Festival, where it won the World Cinema Documentary Audience Award. It was also awarded the 2019 Alfred I. duPont-Columbia University Award and was acquired by Epix.

For her fifth film, Shiva directed Each and Every Day (2021) for MTV Documentary Films. The documentary is an exploration of youth mental health through the eyes of young people who have attempted suicide or have struggled with suicidal thoughts. It premiered on MTV.

Filmography

Director and Producer 
 Bombay Eunuch (2001)
 Stagedoor (2006)
 How to Dance in Ohio (2015)
 This Is Home: A Refugee Story (2018)
Each and Every Day (2021)

References 

American film producers
American film directors
Year of birth missing (living people)
Living people
Vassar College alumni